is a name given to a number of precipices in Sweden.

The name supposedly denotes sites where ritual senicide took place during pagan Nordic prehistoric times, whereby elderly people threw themselves, or were thrown, to their deaths. According to legend, this was done when old people were unable to support themselves or assist in a household.

History of the term
Senicide  and suicide precipices are mentioned in several sources from antiquity, e.g. the Ligurians in Paradoxographus Vaticanus and Procopius in his description of the Heruli from the 6th century CE. Solinus wrote about the happy hyperboreans at the North Pole, where it is daylight for half a year—between the vernal equinox to the autumnal equinox, and described the climate as being so healthy that the people there did not die, but instead, threw themselves from a precipice into the sea.

The term ättestupa  came into use in Sweden in the seventeenth century, inspired by the Old Icelandic saga Gautreks saga, which is partly set in the Swedish region of Götaland. The saga contains a comical episode known as Dalafíflaþáttr ('the story of the fools from the valleys') in which one particular family is so miserly that they prefer to kill themselves than see their wealth spent on hospitality. In this tale, the family members kill themselves by jumping off a cliff which the saga calls the Ættarstapi or Ætternisstapi ("dynasty precipice"), a word which occurs in no Old Norse texts other than this saga. Gautreks saga became known in Sweden in 1664, when an edition and Swedish translation was published by Olaus Verelius. This seems to have inspired Swedish antiquarians from the seventeenth century through into the nineteenth to label various cliffs with the name ättestupa. The Swedish linguist Adolf Noreen started questioning the myth at the end of the nineteenth century, and it is now generally accepted among researchers that the practice of suicide precipices never existed. Place-names which Gautreks saga inspired, however, continue to exist in the Swedish landscape.

The term ättestupa has been used often in modern times, in political contexts, to underline how bad an insufficiently funded social security program can be, especially for retirees.

Associated locations
Several places in Sweden are alleged to be former suicide precipices:
 Keillers Park in Göteborg has a precipice called Ättestupan.
 A part of the village Åby outside of Norrköping was called Ättetorp, and in the nearby forest there is a precipice called Ättestupan.
 Precipices at Vargön and close to the lake Vristulven in Västergötland
 Ättestupeberget at Långared (Alingsås kommun, Västergötland) (RT 90: X=6431606, Y=1297860)
 Ättestupan in Västra Tunhem (Vänersborgs kommun, Västergötland) (RT 90: X=6474997, Y=1301199)
 Kullberget in Hällefors (Örebro län) is locally called "ättestupan".
 Olofströms kommun between Olofström – Gaslunda, by the lake Orlunden
 The western cliff faces of Omberg in Östergötland are said to be an ättestupa.
 Virsehatt nature reserve in Halland is said to be an ättestupa.

In popular culture
In the 1960s, the Swedish comedy radio program Mosebacke Monarki satirically introduced ättestupa, abbreviated ÄTP, as an alternative to ATP, a state-provided pension.

The 2016 comedy series Norsemen depicts a group of elderly men reluctant to perform the ritual after being informed that the tribe no longer has the resources to support them. Rather than commit Ättestupa, they form their own self-sufficient society hidden from the original tribe.

The 2019 horror film Midsommar by Ari Aster uses the term to describe a fictional tradition in which elderly cult members throw themselves off a high cliff in ritual suicide once they reach the age of 72.

See also
 Ubasute
 Euthanasia

References

External links
Vad är sant om ättestupor? – from the periodical Populär Historia

Germanic folklore
Senicide
Icelandic literature
Swedish literature